An abrogative referendum on oil and natural gas drilling was held in Italy on 17 April 2016. The referendum was on the proposed repealing of a law that allows gas and oil drilling concessions extracting hydrocarbon within 12 nautical miles of the Italian coast to be prolonged until the exhaustion of the useful life of the fields.

Although 86% voted in favour of repealing the law, the turnout of 31% was below the majority threshold required to validate the result.

It was the first referendum requested by at least five Regional Councils in the history of the Italian Republic: all 66 previous referendum questions since 1974 were called after the collection of signatures.

Background

The search for hydrocarbon liquids and/or gases in the Italian sea is possible - with some restrictions for the coastal and environmental protection - only in certain "marine areas" identified by the Italian Parliament or by the Ministry of Economic Development. From 2013, new drilling is prohibited in the Tyrrhenian Sea, in the marine protected areas and in the waters within 12 nautical miles from the coast; however, the concessions approved before 2013 may continue until all of the resources are extracted.

Italy authorized a total of 79 offshore platforms: 31 are located over 12 miles from and 48 within 12 miles.

Off-shore production of hydrocarbons in Italy

Within 12 miles, 9 concessions are authorized (with 39 platforms) and their permits have expired and they have asked for an extension: if the "yes" vote wins in the referendum, the 9 expired concessions can not be extended. During 2015 those installations extracted about 622 million cubic meters of natural gas (equivalent to 9% of the national production and 1.1% of total consumption in 2014).

Under the 12 mile limit, there are 17 other concessions expiring between 2017 and 2027, which in 2015 extracted 1.21 billion cubic meters of gas (17.6% of national production and 2.1% of national consumption in 2014) and 500,000 tons of oil (about 9.1% of national production and 0.8% of consumption in 2014). These concessions, in the event of a victory for 'yes' in the referendum, will not be extended after 2027.

Referendum initiative
The referendum was proposed by several regional governments after the national government passed a law allowing drilling concessions to last until oilfields or gasfields are empty. On 19 January 2016 the Constitutional Court approved the referendum. On 12 February the Five Star Movement asked President Sergio Mattarella to delay the referendum until June to allow it to be held alongside local elections in order to raise turnout and save money.

Position of main political parties

Opinion polls

Results

Notes

References

2016 elections in Italy
2016 referendums
2016
Energy in Italy
Oil wells
Energy policy referendums
April 2016 events in Italy